Hanna High School is a 6A public high school in Brownsville, Texas, United States. It is the successor of Brownsville High School. It is one of six high schools operated by the Brownsville Independent School District. In 2015, the school was rated "Met Standard" by the Texas Education Agency.

It is named after veteran South Texas teacher and administrator Homer Lee Hanna, who died in 2004.

References

External links
 

Education in Brownsville, Texas
Brownsville Independent School District high schools